The St. Olav's Medal and the St. Olav's Medal With Oak Branch were instituted by King Haakon VII of Norway on 17 March 1939. They are awarded in recognition of "outstanding services rendered in connection with the spreading of information about Norway abroad and for strengthening the bonds between expatriate Norwegians and their home country".

The medals are in silver, surmounted by the Royal Crown. On the obverse is the portrait of the reigning King with his name and motto. On the reverse, St. Olav's cross. Above the medal is the monogram of the reigning King. It is worn on the left side of the breast with the ribbon of the Order of St. Olav. The medal ranks 9th in the order of precedence of Norwegian medals.

When awarded for services rendered in wartime, the medal carries an oak branch and ranks 6th in the order of precedence of Norwegian medals.

Recipients of the medal
A complete searchable list of medal recipients can be found here.
 1939  Henry Poynter Burnett, Commander (late Rear Admiral), USN
 1939 Brenda Ueland, author and teacher, Minneapolis, Minnesota
 c1942 Captain Andrew Henry, O.B.E. ref. Shetland Family History www.bayanne.info/Shetland Person I.D. I53644
 1944 Egil Melsom, Assistant Engineer on the M/T Gallia
 1951 Rev. Bent Emil Carlsen, known as "Pastor", of Milton, Massachusetts; in recognition of his work among Norwegians in America.
 1954 Percy Grainger, Australian composer and pianist
 1964 Marianne Schigutt, Austrian diplomat
 1976 Helen Svensson Fletre, Swedish born Norwegian-American journalist; In 1976, King Olav bestowed the St. Olav's medal on her - for her sesquicentennial work and for her many years of service to Norway. Wife of Norwegian Artist Lars Fletre
 1993 Margaret Miller, genealogist, Apple Valley, Minnesota
 1994 Kristin Brudevoll, former Director of Norla.
 1995 Lyuba Gorlina, Russian translator
 2002 Andrea Een, Hardanger fiddler, Northfield, Minnesota
 2005 Stan Boreson, entertainer, Seattle, Washington
 2008 Trygve Gunnar Morkemo
2010 Dean Madden for his contributions to the Vesterheim Museum
 2014 Ewart Parkinson, OBE, town planner, Cardiff, Wales, for his role in saving and rebuilding the Norwegian Church in Cardiff Bay
 2017 Glo Wollen, Petersburg, Alaska
 2022 Nina Malterud, Norwegian ceramist

See also
 Orders, decorations, and medals of Norway

References

External links
Official Norwegian royal house web page
 http://medals.org.uk/norway/norway007.htm

Orders, decorations, and medals of Norway